Romania is a nation that has competed at the Hopman Cup tennis tournament on three occasions, the first of which was at the 9th annual staging of the tournament in 1997, when they finished fourth in their group. They replicated this result in 2010 and to date they have not yet bettered it.

Players
This is a list of players who have played for Romania in the Hopman Cup.

Results

1 In the men's singles in the 1997 tie against Switzerland, the Swiss opponent Marc Rosset chose not to compete and conceded the point to Romania.
2 In the 2010 ties against Spain and the United States, Victor Hănescu was unable to compete due to injury, giving the each opposing nation a two-point advantage.

References

Hopman Cup teams
Hopman Cup
Hopman Cup